Reliance Industrial Infrastructure Limited, formerly Chembur Patalganga Pipelines Limited, is an industrial infrastructure company based in Mumbai, India. It is a part of Reliance Industries. It also leases equipment and offers IT consulting services.

History

Founding
It was incorporated on 29 September 1988 and obtained its Certificate of Commencement of business on 4 January 1989. Reliance Industrial Infrastructure Limited was originally incorporated under the name Chembur Patalganaga Pipelines Limited, which was later changed to CPPL Limited in September 1992. In March 1994 the name was changed to Reliance Industrial Infrastructure Limited. It was primarily founded to undertake the projects of laying down two cross-country pipelines from the Bharat Petroleum refinery at Chembur to Reliance Industries Limited petrochemicals complex in Maharashtra.

Reliance Industrial Infrastructure Limited was promoted by Satyapal Jain and associates. The US-based financial advisor Dimensional Fund Advisors is a significant investor in the company.

Important past events
The company set up a 200-millimetre diameter twin pipeline system that connects the Bharat Petroleum refinery at Mahul, Maharashtra to Reliance's petrochemical complex at Patalaganga in Maharashtra. The pipeline carries petroleum products like Naptha and Kerosene.

Reliance Industrial Infrastructure Limited has commissioned facilities like Supervisory Control and Data Acquisition system and the Cathodic Protection system. The company has also constructed a Jackwell at River Tapi and a Raw Water Pipeline System at Hazira. The infrastructure company constructed a 70,000 kilolitre petrochemical product storage and distribution Terminal at the Jawaharlal Nehru Port Trust Area in Maharashtra. It has also lent various construction machineries to various sites across India.

Products

Product/Business Divisions
Types of business and product divisions such as Petroleum; Oil & Gas; Fibers etc.

Corporate Structure
 The company board of directors, important executives and other people instrumental to the success of the company
 Independent Non-Executive Director – Chandra Raj Mehta
 Non-Independent Non-Executive Director – S C Malhotra
 Independent Non-Executive Director – Sandeep H Junnarkar
 Executive Director – Dilip V Dherai
 Non-Independent Non-Executive Chairman – Mahesh K Kamdar

Stock : Listing and Performance over time
Initial stock prices, trends, major movements in stock prices(any that affected the market), current stock price

As of March 2009 the highest price for RIIL shares on the BSE index was recorded to be at Rs.310.00 while the lowest price was Rs.231.05. As of March 2009, Reliance Industries Limited held 45.43% of the total shares of the company. The current stock price of the shares of Reliance Industrial Infrastructure Limited is around Rs.886 which is a major upward leap from its prices in the previous year.

Subsidiaries
 Reliance Corporate Centre Limited and Reliance Convention and Exhibition Centre Limited became the subsidiaries of Reliance Industrial Infrastructure Limited during the financial year of 2008–2009.

Sponsorships

Only as part of the Reliance Group.

References

External links

Companies based in Mumbai
Indian companies established in 1988
Reliance Industries subsidiaries
1988 establishments in Maharashtra
Companies listed on the Bombay Stock Exchange